Nowshera (pr. Nowkhār )  is the capital city of Nowshera District in the Khyber Pakhtunkhwa province of Pakistan. It is the 78th largest city in Pakistan and ninth largest city in the province of Khyber Pakhtunkhwa.

Etymology
The local Pashto name of the city is Nowkhār, which means "New City". It was translated into Dari Persian and Urdu as Nowshehra, which is a word with the same meaning.

History

Nowshera was developed during the Afghan Durrani Empire. The Battle of Nowshera was fought in March 1823 between the forces of Pashtuns with support from Azim Khan Barakzai, Durrani governor against the Sikh Khalsa Army of Ranjit Singh. The battle was a decisive victory for the Sikh Empire against Afghans and led to their occupation of the Peshawar Valley.

During British rule, Nowshera was a town and cantonment as well as tehsil of the Peshawar District (later Peshawar Division). The town was on the route of the North-Western Railway and Grand Trunk Road. The population according to the 1901 census of India was 9,518.

The Imperial Gazetteer of India described the cantonment as follows:

Languages and major tribes
Until 1920 KP province was part of Punjab under Ranjeet Singh. Historically locals use to speak Hindko dialect of Punjabi language which is spoken in Old City and areas of Nowshera Kalan, Akora Khattak, Shaidu, Jehangira and several other villages situated along the Grand Trunk Road. After demographic changes in recent decades due to Afghan Refugees and Tribal peoples arrival, Pashto language speakers are in majority today. Urdu being National language is also spoken and understood.English is official and educational language. Arabic is religious language also used in secondary school education.

The major tribes in the district are Durrani, Khattak, Paracha, Awan, Kaka Khel, Gakhar Rajgan, Gujjar, Arain, Babar, Yousafzai, Muhammadzai and Manki khel. The Khattak tribe makes up 65% of the population of the District. especially their sub-tribe Akora Khattak.

The Kakakhels are a prominent Syed clan of Khyber Pukhtunkhwa. Their roots reach to Hazrat Ali bin Ismail bin Imame-Jafer Sadiq. Kakakhels are descendants of the Islamic Sufi (wali) Syed Kastir Gul (also known as Kaka Sahib), and Sheikh Rahamkar - a student of Sheikh Hazrat Akhun Adeen/Adyan Seljuki. Kastir Gul was affectionately known as "Kakasahib", and his descendants are known as Kakakhels - meaning "the sons of Kakasahib". The clan originated in a small village known as "Kakasaib" in Nowshera. (It is a matter of debate whether Kaka Khels qualify as a Pashtun tribe as they are a family group with affiliation to one progenitor, Kaka Sahib – but it is not known if he was a Pashtun – Mian or Miah are the descendents of Kaka Sahib.)

Khattaks are the Largest tribe in District Nowshera with approximately 65%-70% of total district population. Nizampur area, Khairabad, Akorra Khattak, Mera Akorra, Misri banda, Jehangira, Merra Jehangira, Shaidu, Wattar, Surya Khel, Cherat area, Manki Sharif, and all surrounding areas of these villages are dominated by Khattak tribe.

On the right side of Kabul river across district Nowshera are non Khattack Pashtun tribe living in Akbarpura, Zakhi, Mohab Banda( all banda-jat villegs), khushmaqam, Tarkha, etc.

Geography 
Nowshera District is bordered by Peshawar District to the west, Mardan District to the north, Charsadda District to the northwest, Swabi District to the northeast, Kohat District to the south, Orakzai Agency to the southwest, and Attock District to the east.

Generally, winters are cold from November to February, and summers are hot from June to August.

Demography
Pashto is the native language of the majority of residents. Hindko(a Punjabi language dialect) is also spoken in the city and parts of surrounding villages. Urdu, being the national language of Pakistan, is also widely understood.

According to the 1998 census of Pakistan the population was 874,373. The male population was 455,598 (52.10%), while the female population was 418,775 (47.90%), a population density of 500.2 persons per km². The population of Urban dwellers was 227030 (25.96%) and that of Rural dwellers was 647343 (74.04%). The annual growth rate was 2.9%. The literacy rate was 89%.

Transportation
Nowshera is well connected with the rest of the Khyber Pakhtunkhwa province and other provinces of Pakistan through airports, railways, and roads.

Air
Bacha Khan International Airport in Peshawar and Islamabad International Airport in Islamabad are situated at a drive of around 1 hour and 2 hours, respectively.

Rail
Pakistan Railways offers passengers and freight rail services. Kabul River railway station  Khushal Kot Railway station Amangarh  and Nowshera Junction railway station are in the city.

Road

National Highway 5, or N-5, is Pakistan’s longest highway running from the port city of Karachi to the border crossing at Torkham. Its total length is 1,756 km and it runs north from Karachi located in Sindh province to Hyderabad, Moro and Khairpur before crossing into Punjab province where it passes through Multan, Sahiwal, Lahore, Sheikhupura District, Gujranwala, Gujrat, Jhelum and Rawalpindi. At Rawalpindi, it turns eastwards and passes through Attock Khurd before crossing the Indus River into Khyber Pakhtunkhwa to continue through Nowshera and Peshawar before entering the Khyber Pass and reaching the border town of Torkham.

The M-1 motorway in Punjab and Khyber-Pakhtunkhwa, Pakistan. It is 155 km long, with 67 km in Punjab and the remaining 88 km in Khyber-Pakhtunkhwa. It has become a vital link to Afghanistan and Central Asia and is expected to take much traffic off the highly used N5. It is part of Pakistan’s Motorway Network. M1 begins northeast of Peshawar as it moves in an eastern direction, crossing over the Kabul River. From here it passes through Charsadda, Risalpur, Swabi and Rashakai before crossing the Indus River.

The historical Grand Trunk (GT) Road also passes through Nowshera. Swat Expressway also starts nearby Nowshera and ends at near Swat.

Economic Zone 
After the launch of CPEC project, Rashakai village of Nowshera is now an Economic Zone of KPK.

Administrative units
 Tehsils 02
 Union Councils 47
 Mauzas 153
 Municipal Committees 04
 Town Committees 01
 Cantonment 03

See also 
Nowshera Cantonment
Nowshera District
Kund Park

References

External links

Cities in Khyber Pakhtunkhwa
Populated places in Nowshera District
Kabul River